John Richard Farr (July 18, 1857 – December 11, 1933) was a Republican member of the U.S. House of Representatives from Pennsylvania.

Biography
John R. Farr was born in Scranton, Pennsylvania, and attended Scranton's School of the Lackawanna and Phillips Academy in Andover, Massachusetts. He graduated from Lafayette College in Easton, Pennsylvania. He worked as a newsboy, printer, and publisher. He was active in the real estate business.

He served four years on the Scranton School Board. He was a member of the Pennsylvania State House of Representatives in 1891, 1893, 1895, 1897, and 1899, serving as speaker of the 1899 session.  As a state legislator he introduced bills to make public education compulsory, and to provide free textbooks to public schools; both measures passed.

Farr was an unsuccessful candidate for election in 1908, but was elected as a Republican to the Sixty-second and to the three succeeding Congresses. He successfully contested the election of Patrick McLane to the Sixty-sixth Congress, though his success came almost at the end of McLane's term. He was an unsuccessful candidate for renomination in 1920, 1930, and 1932.

He resumed the real estate business in Scranton, where he died, aged 76, after suffering a heart attack. Interred in Shady Lane Cemetery in Chinchilla, Pennsylvania.

Gallery

See also
 Speaker of the Pennsylvania House of Representatives

Sources

The Political Graveyard

Footnotes

1857 births
1933 deaths
Republican Party members of the Pennsylvania House of Representatives
Speakers of the Pennsylvania House of Representatives
Politicians from Scranton, Pennsylvania
Republican Party members of the United States House of Representatives from Pennsylvania